Argentina competed in the 2019 Pan American Games in Lima, Peru from July 26 to August 11, 2019.

On May 24, 2019, sailor Javier Conte was named as the country's flag bearer during the opening ceremony.

Competitors
The following is the list of number of competitors (per gender) participating at the games per sport/discipline.

Medalists

Archery

Men

Women

Mixed

Artistic swimming

Argentina qualified a total of two athletes.

Athletics

Men
Track & road events

Field events

Women
Track & road events

Field events

Badminton

Argentina qualified a team of two badminton athletes (one per gender).

Singles

Doubles

Baseball

Argentina qualified a men's team of 24 athletes by winning the 2018 South American Championships. This marked the first time the country qualified for the sport at the Pan American Games. The previous two times Argentina competed, it was because it was awarded a host spot in 1951 and 1995.

Group B

Seventh place match

Basketball

5x5
Summary

Men's tournament

Preliminary round

Semifinal

Gold medal match

Women's tournament

Preliminary round

Fifth place match

3x3
Summary

Men's tournament

Preliminary round

Fifth place match

Women's tournament

Preliminary round

Semifinal

Gold medal game

Basque pelota

Men

Women

Beach volleyball

Argentina qualified four beach volleyball athletes (two men and two women).

Bodybuilding

Argentina qualified one female bodybuilder.

Women
Bikini fitness

Bowling

Boxing

Argentina qualified four boxers (two men and two women).

Men

Women

Canoeing

Slalom
Argentina qualified a total of six slalom athletes (three men and three women).

Sprint

Men

Women

Qualification legend: QF – Qualify to final; SF – Qualify to semifinal

Cycling

BMX
Freestyle

Racing

Mountain biking

Road cycling
Men

Women

Track
Madison

Sprint

Omnium

Keirin

Equestrian

Argentina qualified a full team of 12 equestrians (four per discipline).

Dressage

Eventing

Jumping

Fencing

Argentina qualified a full team of 18 fencers (nine men and nine women).

Men

Women

Golf

Argentina qualified a full team of four golfers (two men and two women).

Field hockey

Argentina qualified a men's and women's team (of 16 athletes each, for a total of 32) by being winning both tournaments at the field hockey at the 2018 South American Games competition.

Summary

Men's tournament

Team roster

Preliminary round

Quarterfinal

Semifinal

Gold medal match

Women's tournament

Preliminary round

Quarterfinal

Semifinal

Gold medal match

Football

Argentina qualified a women's team (of 18 athletes) by finishing in one of the three qualification spots at the 2018 Copa América Femenina. Argentina also qualified a men's team of 18 athletes.

Summary

Men's tournament

Argentina qualified a men's team of 18 athletes.

Head coach: Fernando Batista

Group A

Semifinals

Gold medal match

Women's tournament

Head coach: Carlos Borrello

Group B

Semifinals

Gold medal match

Gymnastics

Artistic

Men
Team Finals & Individual Qualification

Individual Finals

Women
Team Finals & Individual Qualification

Individual Finals

Rhythmic
Individual Qualification

Individual Finals

Trampoline
Argentina qualified a team of three gymnasts in trampoline (one man and two women).

Handball

Argentina qualified men's and women's teams.

Summary

Men's tournament

Semifinal

Gold medal match

Women's tournament

Semifinal

Gold medal match

Judo

Men

Women

Karate

Men

Women

Modern pentathlon

Argentina qualified a full team of six modern pentathletes (three men and three women).

Men

Women

Racquetball

Argentina qualified five racquetball athletes (two men and three women).

Roller sports

Artistic

Speed

Rowing

Men

Women

Rugby sevens

Summary

Men's tournament

Pool stage

Semifinal

Final

Women's tournament

Pool stage

5th–8th place classification

Fifth place match

Sailing

Argentina has qualified 11 boats for a total of 17 sailors.

Men

Women

Mixed

Open

Shooting

Men
Pistol and rifle

Shotgun

Women
Pistol and rifle

Shotgun

Mixed

Softball

Argentina qualified a men's team (of 15 athletes) by being ranked in the top five nations at the 2017 Pan American Championships.

Men's tournament

Preliminary round

Semifinals

Grand final

Squash

Men

Women

Mixed

Surfing

Argentina qualified nine surfers (five men and four women) in the sport's debut at the Pan American Games.

Artistic

Race

Swimming

Argentina qualified 17 swimmers (11 men and six women).

Men

Women

Mixed

Table tennis

Singles

Doubles

Team competition

Taekwondo

Men

Women

Tennis

Argentina qualified 6 tennis players (3 men and 3 women).

Singles

Doubles

Triathlon

Individual

Volleyball

Summary

Men's tournament 

Preliminary round

Semifinal

Gold medal match

Women's tournament 

Preliminary round

Semifinal

Bronze medal match

Water polo

Summary

Men's tournament

Preliminary round

Quarterfinal

Semifinal

Bronze medal match

Water skiing

Argentina qualified 5 athletes (4 men and 1 woman).

Water Skiing
Men

Women

Wakeboard

Weightlifting

Men

Women

Wrestling

Men

Women

See also
Argentina at the 2019 Parapan American Games
Argentina at the 2020 Summer Olympics

References

Nations at the 2019 Pan American Games
Pan American Games
2019